is a Japanese amateur astronomer affiliated with the Yatsuka Observatory. He is noted for numerous discoveries, including his 2007 discovery of the Nova Vulpeculae, and 28 numbered minor planets during 1993–1999.

The main-belt asteroid 5379 Abehiroshi, discovered by Osamu Muramatsu in 1991 is named in his honor. The official naming citation was published by the Minor Planet Center on 28 July 1999.

List of discovered minor planets

See also

References 
 

1958 births
Discoverers of asteroids
20th-century Japanese astronomers
Living people